The Mental Health Foundation is a UK charity, whose mission is "to help people to thrive through understanding, protecting, and sustaining their mental health."

History
The Mental Health Foundation was founded in 1949, as the Mental Health Research Fund, by Derek Richter, a neurochemist and director of research at Whitchurch Hospital. Richter enlisted the help of stockbroker Ian Henderson, who became the chair, while Victoria Cross recipient Geoffrey Vickers became chair of the research committee.

In 1972, the Mental Health Foundation took its current name, shifting its "focus away from laboratory research and towards working directly with—and learning from—people [who] experience mental health problems."

The Foundation has also focussed on "overlooked and under-researched areas," including personality disorders and issues affecting various ethnic groups. In 1999, the Foundation took their work with learning disabilities forwards, creating the Foundation for People with Learning Disabilities.

Mental Health Awareness Week
Each year, for a week in May, the Mental Health Foundation leads Mental Health Awareness Week.

Mental Health Awareness Week was first held in 2001, and became one of the biggest mental health awareness events in the world.

Themes

Green ribbon
The green ribbon is the "international symbol for mental health awareness."

The Foundation's green ribbon ambassadors, include: Olly Alexander, Aisling Bea, Olivia Colman, Matt Haig, David Harewood, Nadiya Hussain, Grant Hutchison, Alex Lawther, and Graham Norton.

The movement uses the hashtag #PinItForMentalHealth.

Funding
The Foundation's total income for the financial year ending 31 March 2018 was £5.8m, with sources including donations (individual and corporate), legacies and grants.

Organization
The Foundation is an incorporated UK charity headed by a board of 12 trustees. Aisha Sheikh-Anene was appointed Chair of the board of trustees in 2020.

The president of the Foundation is Dr Jacqui Dyer MBE and the patron is Princess Alexandra.

See also
Foundation for People with Learning Disabilities
Mental health in the United Kingdom

References

Health charities in the United Kingdom
Health in the London Borough of Southwark
Medical and health organisations based in London
Mental health organisations in the United Kingdom
1949 establishments in the United Kingdom
Organisations based in the London Borough of Southwark
Organizations established in 1949